Chhata is a town and a nagar panchayat in Mathura district  in the state of Uttar Pradesh, India. Earlier this town was known as Chhatravan.

Geography
It has an average elevation of 186 metres (610 feet).

Demographics
As of 2001 census of India, Chhata has a population of 19,836. Males constitute 54% of the population and females 46%. Chhata has an average literacy rate of 51%, lower than the national average of 59.5%; with male literacy of 63% and female literacy of 37%. 19% of the population is under 6 years of age.

Politics
In Uttar Pradesh Legislative Assembly election, 2017 Laxmi Narayan Chaudhary of BJP became the Member of Legislative Assembly from Chhata Constituency.

Industries 
Chhata is a small Town but has many types of industries in and around the town.

Packaging material 
Vacmet India, which is a packing material manufacturing company, has four production units in Chhata at different locations.

Beverages 
Varun Beverages Limited is a bottling plant (Pepsi), there is another bottling plant belongs to Brindavan Agro Industries ( a franchise bottler for Coca-Cola).

Textiles 
There are textile manufacturing and processing companies like Ginnifilaments limited which turned Chhata into a Mill town,  a 25-year old textile mill situated in Chhata, providing employment for female and male workers of Chhata and neighboring villages.

The other old textile mills include Pashupati, Shamken, and newer textile companies like Jain Cord Industries Pvt Ltd, etc.

Sugar mill 
A sugar mill (Chhata Sugar Mill) was established in 1975, which is closed now. The mill was started on 100 acres of land. It was the only sugar mill in Agra mandal.

Nearby cities
Vrindavan
Mathura
Khair
Aligarh

References

Cities and towns in Mathura district